|}

The Grand National Trial is a Premier Handicap National Hunt steeplechase in Great Britain which is open to horses aged five years or older. It is run at Haydock Park over a distance of about 3 miles and 4½ furlongs (3 miles, 4 furlongs and 97 yards, or 
), and during its running there are twenty-two fences to be jumped. It is a handicap race, and it is scheduled to take place each year in February.

The event was established in 1947 and took place every year until 1984.  From 1985 to 1990 there was no race at the meeting over this distance, but in 1991 the Greenall Whitley Gold Cup was increased in distance from 3 miles (4,828 metres) to 3 miles and 4 furlongs (5,633 metres), effectively recreating the original Haydock Grand National Trial. The Grand National Trial name was readopted in 1996.
Subsequent sponsors included De Vere Group, Red Square Vodka and Blue Square, the race title suffixing the sponsor's name with "Gold Cup".

The Tote took over sponsorship from the 2011 running and the race title was changed to the totesport.com Grand National trial. As the name implies, the race serves as an important trial for the Grand National. It is now sponsored by William Hill. The race held Grade 3 status until 2022 and was re-classified as a Premier Handicap from the 2023 running when Grade 3 status was renamed by the British Horseracing Authority.

Winners
 Weights given in stones and pounds.
{| class = "sortable" | border="1" style="border-collapse: collapse; font-size:90%"
|- bgcolor="#77dd77" align="center"
! width="36px" | Year
! width="160px" | Winner
! width="32px" | Age
! width="56px" | Weight
! width="180px" | Jockey
! width="180px" | Trainer
|-bgcolor="#eeeeee"
|1947Abandoned because of snow and frost
|-
|1948||Gallery||10||11-03||M Prendergast||W Bissill
|-
|1949||Freebooter||8||11-11||Tim Molony||Bobby Renton
|-
|-bgcolor="#eeeeee"
|1950Abandoned because of snow and frost
|-
|1951||Cardinal Error||7||11–12||R Curran||J Wight
|-
|-bgcolor="#eeeeee"
|1952Abandoned because of frost
|-
|1953||Witty||8||10-09||G Slack||W Hall
|-bgcolor="#eeeeee"
|1954Abandoned because of snow and frost
|-
|1955||Goosander||7||11-04||A Thompson||Neville Crump
|-
|1956||Sundew||10||11-10||Fred Winter||F Hudson
|-
|1957||Goosander||9||11-08||H East||Neville Crump
|-
|1958||Giles Farnaby||12||09-07||P Madden||T Lord
|-bgcolor="#eeeeee"
|1959Abandoned because of frost
|-
|1960||Highland Dandy||8||10-03||R Langley||G Owen
|-
|1901||Uncle Isaac||8||10-05||C Scott||T Scott
|-
|1962||Solfen||10||12-00||Toss Taaffe||W O'Grady (Ir)
|-bgcolor="#eeeeee"
|1963Abandoned because of snow
|-
|1964||Reproduction||11||09-07||Stan Mellor||G Owen
|-bgcolor="#eeeeee"
|1965Abandoned because of frost
|-
|1966||The Ringer||7||10–11||Paddy Broderick||Arthur Stephenson
|-
|1967||Bassnet||8||10–12||David Nicholson||A Kilpatrick
|-bgcolor="#eeeeee"
|1968Abandoned due to foot and mouth outbreak
|-
|1969||Game Purston||11||10-01||Ken White||Matt McCourt
|-
|1970||French Excuse||8||10-01||Ken White||Fred Rimell
|-
|1971||The Otter||10||10-01||T M Jones||R Dening
|-
|1972||Rouge Autumn||8||10–13||Ken White||Fred Rimell
|-
|1973||Highland Seal||10||10-00||R Dennard||R Dening           
|-bgcolor="#eeeeee"
|1974Abandoned because of waterlogged state of course
|-
|1975||Red Rum||10||12-00||Brian Fletcher||Ginger McCain                  
|-
|1976||Forest King||7||10-07||D Munro||K Hogg                 
|-
|1977||Andy Pandy||8||10–13||John Burke||Fred Rimell               
|-
|1978||Tregarron||11||10-07||Jonjo O'Neill||Ken Oliver                
|-bgcolor="#eeeeee"
|1979Abandoned because of frost
|-
|1980||Narvik||7||10-00||Colin Hawkins||Neville Crump                    
|-bgcolor="#eeeeee"
|1981Abandoned because of waterlogged state of course
|-bgcolor="#eeeeee"
|1982Abandoned because of frost and snow
|-
|1983||Ashley House||9||10-01||Robert Earnshaw||Michael Dickinson           
|-bgcolor="#eeeeee"
|1984Abandoned because of frost
|-bgcolor="#eeeeee"
|1985–1990No race
|-
| 1991
| Twin Oaks
| 11
| 11-00
| Neale Doughty
| Gordon W. Richards
|-
| 1992
| Cool Ground
| 10
| 11-03
| Adrian Maguire
| Toby Balding
|-
| 1993
| Party Politics
| 9
| 11-07
| Carl Llewellyn
| Nick Gaselee
|-
| 1994
| Master Oats 
| 8
| 10-02
| Norman Williamson
| Kim Bailey
|-
| 1995
| Nuaffe
| 10
| 11-00
| Sean O'Donovan
| Pat Fahy
|-
| 1996
| Lo Stregone
| 10
| 10-00
| Charlie Swan
| Tom Tate
|-
| 1997
| Suny Bay
| 8
| 10-08
| Jamie Osborne
| Charlie Brooks
|-
| 1998
| Dom Samourai
| 7
| 10-00
| Chris Maude
| Martin Pipe
|-
| 1999
| Young Kenny
| 8
| 10-00
| Brendan Powell
| Peter Beaumont
|-
| 2000
| The Last Fling
| 10
| 11–01
| Seamus Durack
| Sue Smith
|-
| 2001
| Frantic Tan
| 9
| 10-04
| Carl Llewellyn
| Nigel Twiston-Davies
|-bgcolor="#eeeeee"
| 2002Abandoned due to waterlogged state of course
|-
| 2003
| Shotgun Willy
| 9
| 11–12
| Ruby Walsh
| Paul Nicholls
|-
| 2004
| Jurancon II
| 7
| 10-06
| Joey Elliot
| Martin Pipe
|-
| 2005
| Forest Gunner
| 11
| 10-10
| Peter Buchanan
| Richard Ford
|-
| 2006
| Ossmoses
| 9
| 10-00
| Richard McGrath
| Don Forster
|-
| 2007
| Heltornic
| 7
| 10-00
| Tom Scudamore
| Michael Scudamore
|-
| 2008
| Miko de Beauchene
| 8
| 11–12
| Andrew Thornton
| Robert & Sally Alner
|-
| 2009
| Rambling Minster
| 11
| 11-00
| James Reveley
| Keith Reveley
|-
| 2010
| Silver by Nature
| 8
| 10–11
| Peter Buchanan
| Lucinda Russell
|-
| 2011
| Silver by Nature
| 9
| 11–12
| Peter Buchanan
| Lucinda Russell
|-
| 2012
| Giles Cross
| 10
| 10-5
| Denis O'Regan
| Victor Dartnall
|-
| 2013
| Well Refreshed
| 9
| 10-03
| Joshua Moore
| Gary Moore
|-
| 2014
| Rigadin De Beauchene
| 9
| 10-05
| Robbie Dunne
| Venetia Williams
|-
| 2015
| Lie Forrit
| 11
| 11-06
| Peter Buchanan
| Lucinda Russell
|-
| 2016
| Bishops Road
| 8
| 11-07
| Richard Johnson
| Kerry Lee
|-
| 2017
| Vieux Lion Rouge
| 8
| 11-06
| Tom Scudamore
| David Pipe
|-
| 2018
| Yala Enki
| 8
| 10-11
| Charlie Deutsch
| Venetia Williams
|-
| 2019
| Robinsfirth
| 10
| 11-04
| Sean Bowen
| Colin Tizzard
|-
| 2020
| Smooth Stepper
| 11
| 10-00
| Harry Bannister
| Alex Hales
|-
| 2021
| Lord Du Mesnil
| 8
| 11-06
| Paul O'Brien
| Richard Hobson
|-
| 2022
| Bristol De Mai
| 11
| 11-12
| Sam Twiston-Davies
| Nigel Twiston-Davies
|-
| 2023
| Quick Wave
| 10
| 11-08
| Henry Bannister 
| Venetia Williams
|}

See also
 Horse racing in Great Britain
 List of British National Hunt races

References

 Racing Post:
 Timeform Chasers & Hurdlers Statistical Companion 1992–93
 pedigreequery.com – Blue Square (ex-Red Square) Gold Cup Chase – Haydock.
 racenewsonline.co.uk – Red Square Vodka Gold Cup (2007).

External links
 Race Recordings 

National Hunt races in Great Britain
Haydock Park Racecourse
National Hunt chases
Recurring sporting events established in 1947
1947 establishments in England